The South African Railways Class 11E of 1985 is an electric locomotive.

Between 1985 and 1987, the South African Railways placed forty-five Class 11E electric locomotives with a Co-Co wheel arrangement in mainline service on the Coalink line.

Manufacturers
The 25 kV AC Class 11E electric locomotive was designed for the South African Railways (SAR) by General Motors (GM) while its thyristor traction technology was provided by Allmänna Svenska Elektriska Aktiebolaget (ASEA) of Sweden. It was built in South Africa by General Motors South Africa (GMSA), whose corporate name was changed to Delta Motor Corporation two-thirds through the locomotive building process. Altogether forty-five locomotives were delivered between 1985 and 1987, numbered in the range from 11-001 to 11-045.

Characteristics

Appearance
Following the Class 9E in 1978 and the Class 7E1 in 1980, the Class 11E was the third single-cab mainline electric locomotive to be acquired by the SAR. Until the Class 9E was introduced all South African mainline electric locomotives were dual cab units, but since the Classes 9E, 7E1 and 11E locomotives were designed to be used in a service where multiple unit operation was the normal practice, a second cab was deemed unnecessary.

Brakes
Since they are used on a route where loaded trains face steeper descending than ascending grades, the locomotive was designed to produce  of rheostatic braking power.

Bogies
The Class 11E was built with sophisticated traction linkages on the bogies, similar to the bogie design which was introduced on the Class 6E1 in 1969. Together with the locomotive's electronic wheel-slip detection system, these traction struts, mounted between the linkages on the bogies and the locomotive body and colloquially referred to as grasshopper legs, ensure the maximum transfer of power to the rails without causing wheel-slip by reducing the adhesion of the leading bogie and increasing that of the trailing bogie by as much as 15% upon starting.

Works numbers and delivery dates
The table lists the Class 11E works numbers and the date on which each unit was delivered to the SAR.

Service
Until 1978, all electrified routes in South Africa used 3 kV DC. Beginning in 1978,  was introduced on all new mainline electrification projects bar one, the exception being the Orex iron ore line from Sishen to Saldanha where 50 kV AC was used. There are four isolated  routes.
 From Pyramid South to Pietersburg and via Rustenburg to Thabazimbi.
 From Ermelo to the Richards Bay Coal Terminal at Richards Bay.
 From Port Elizabeth to De Aar and from there north to Kimberley and south to Beaufort West.
 From East London to Springfontein in the Free State.

The Class 11E was designed primarily for export coal hauling on the 25 kV AC Coalink line between the Mpumalanga coalfields around Ermelo and the Richards Bay Coal Terminal via Vryheid in KwaZulu-Natal.

Liveries
All the Class 11E locomotives were delivered in the SAR red oxide livery with signal red buffer beams and cowcatchers, with yellow whiskers on the ends folded over to below the side windows and with the number plates on the sides mounted on three-stripe yellow wings. In the late 1990s all were repainted in the Spoornet blue livery with either solid or outline numbers on the long hood sides.

Illustration

References

3120
Co-Co locomotives
General Motors locomotives
GMSA locomotives
Delta locomotives
Cape gauge railway locomotives
Railway locomotives introduced in 1985
1985 in South Africa